Memorial University is a comprehensive university located primarily in St. John's, Newfoundland and Labrador, Canada.

Memorial University may also refer to:

 Florida Memorial University, a private coeducational four-year university in Miami Gardens, Florida
 Hubert Kairuki Memorial University, a university in Tanzania
 Lincoln Memorial University, a private four-year co-educational liberal arts college located in Harrogate, Tennessee